Nieblum (Fering: Njiblem, Danish: Niblum) is a municipality on the island of Föhr, in the district of Nordfriesland, in Schleswig-Holstein, Germany.

Geography
Nieblum is located on the southern shore of Föhr, approximately halfways between the eastern and western edges of the island. Next to the village of Nieblum proper, the municipality includes the once independent hamlet of Goting which is situated just west of Nieblum. In Goting there is a cliffside of several meters height.

History
Many of the old Frisian houses used to belong to sea captains who had made a fortune as whalers on Dutch ships. It was a hard and dangerous work which claimed a lot of lives. The tombstones in the graveyard of St. John's church, the so-called "Frisian Cathedral", in the village testify this. The church was built in the 13th century and it is the largest of the three churches on Föhr.

Politics
Since the communal elections of 2018, the Nieblumer Wählergemeinschaft holds all nine seats in the municipality council.

Culture and sights

Nieblum's main attraction is the defiant church of St. John with its historically preserved graveyard. Moreover, the view of Nieblum with its thatched houses and many trees is pleasant to the eye.

Since the 1950s, the Ernst Schlee school of Hamburg-Klein-Flottbek had been operating a summer boarding school in Nieblum. After conversion into a public trading school, the institution was transferred to the Othmarschen high school.

1979, Nieblum was awarded as (West-)Germany's most beautiful village. Südlich von Nieblum befindet sich der Leuchtturm Nieblum

Notable people
Jens Jacob Eschels (1757-1842), navigator. He became known by his autobiography.
Carl-Christian Arfsten (1889-1969), politician (CDU) and Schleswig-Holstein MP

References

External links

Nieblum

Föhr
Nordfriesland